Bishop v. Aronov, 926 F.2d 1066 (11th Cir. 1991), was a 1991 legal case in which Phillip A. Bishop, an exercise physiology professor at the University of Alabama, sued the college on free speech and academic freedom grounds, when it instructed him not to teach "intelligent design theory" in an extracurricular class and not to lecture on "evidences of God in Human Physiology" in class.  The District Court for the Northern District of Alabama found in favor of Bishop but the university appealed and the United States Court of Appeals for the Eleventh Circuit found that the classroom, during instructional time, was not an open forum, and that the university had a right to set the curriculum.

A similar case was Edwards v. California University of Pennsylvania (3d Cir. 1998).

Related cases

References

External links

 

United States education case law
United States Free Speech Clause case law
United States creationism and evolution case law
1991 in religion
1991 in United States case law
1991 in education
United States Court of Appeals for the Eleventh Circuit cases
University of Alabama
United States lawsuits